University of Latvia (shortened LU) is a state-run university located in Riga, Latvia, established in 1919.

The QS World University Rankings places the university between 801st and 1000th globally, seventh in the Baltic states, and 50th in the EECA (Emerging Europe and Central Asia) category.

History
 
The University of Latvia, initially named as the Higher School of Latvia was founded on September 28, 1919, on the basis of the former Riga Polytechnic (founded in 1862). The first rector of the university was chemist Paul Walden. In 1923, the school received its current name with the approval of its constitution, the University of Latvia (Universitas Latviensis).

In the period between 1919 and 1940, the University of Latvia was the main centre of higher education, science and culture in the Republic of Latvia. The former building of the Riga Polytechnic on Raiņa bulvāris 19 serves as the university's main building. In the pre-WWII years, it was possible to gain higher academic education not only at the University of Latvia but also at the Latvian State Conservatory and Academy of Arts.

With the beginning of the Soviet occupation, the university was renamed as the Latvian State University (LVU) from 1940 to 1941 and from 1944/1945 to 1958. Under the Nazi occupation, from 1942 to 1944/1945 its name was the University of Riga. After World War II, over time the Latvian University of Agriculture, Riga Stradiņš University, and Riga Technical University separated from the University of Latvia and became well-known centres of education and research in their own right. In 1958, the university was renamed as the Pēteris Stučka Latvian State University, which was its official name until 1990.

With Latvia regaining independence, the Supreme Council of the Republic of Latvia reconfirmed the Constitution of the University of Latvia on September 18, 1991. It stated that the institution is "a state establishment of academic education, science and culture which serves the needs of Latvia and its people". Alongside the Constitution, the flag, the hymn, the university's emblem, the rector's chain, and the official garments for the rector, vice-rector and deans were re-adopted as attributes of the University of Latvia.

The EuroFaculty, created by the CBSS to support reforms at the universities in Tartu, Riga, and Vilnius, was organized with its headquarters at the University of Latvia from 1993 to 2005. The Riga Teacher Training and Educational Management Academy was merged into the university in 2017.

Enrollment
The University of Latvia offers undergraduate, graduate, and doctoral levels of study and in October 2014 more than 14,000 students, including Ph.D. and exchange students, had enrolled in various study programs. Almost one third of them studied in business and economics related programs.

Organisation

The university consists of 13 faculties:
 Faculty of biology
 Department of plant physiology
 Department of botany and ecology
 Department of human and animal physiology
 Department of hydrobiology
 Department of microbiology and biotechnology
 Department of molecular biology
 Department of zoology and animal ecology
 Faculty of chemistry
 Department of inorganic chemistry
 Department of analytical chemistry
 Department of organic chemistry
 Department of physical chemistry
 Centre of food chemistry
 Centre of chemistry didactics
 Faculty of physics, mathematics and optometry
 Department of pptometry and vision science
 Department of mathematics
 Department of physics
 Laser Centre of the University of Latvia
 Extramural Mathematics School of A. Liepa
 Faculty of business, economics and management
 Department of global economics interdisciplinary studies
 Department of economics
 Department of finance and accounting
 Department of management sciences
 Faculty of education, psychology and arts
 Department of education sciences
 Department of pedagogy
 Department of psychology
 Department of teacher training
 Sports centre
 Centre of adult pedagogical education
 Faculty of geography and earth sciences
 Department of geography
 Department of geology
 Department of environmental science
 Faculty of history and philosophy
 Department of history and archaeology
 Department of philosophy and ethics
 Faculty of law
 Center of continuing legal education and professional development
 Student government
 Chair of civil law
 Chair of constitutional law
 Chair of criminal law
 Chair of international and European law
 Chair of legal theory and history
 Legal clinic of the faculty of law
 Faculty of medicine
 Centre of health management and informatics
 Department of anatomy and histology
 Centre of experimental surgery
 Department of pharmacology
 Department of internal medicine 
 Department of medical biochemistry
 Department of medical pedagogy, ethics and history
 Department of oncology
 Department of surgery
 Department of pathology
 Department of pediatrics
 Centre of social pediatrics
 Faculty of humanities
 Department of Asian studies
 Department of contrastive linguistics, translation and interpreting
 Department of classical philology and anthropology studies
 Department of English studies
 Department of Germanic studies
 Department of Latvian and Baltic studies
 Department of Romance studies
 Department of Russian and Slavonic studies
 Faculty of social sciences
 Department of information and library studies
 Department of communications studies
 Department of political science
 Department of sociology
 Center for the cognitive sciences and semantics
 Faculty of theology
 Department of systematic and practical theology
 Department of church history and history of religions
 Department of biblical theology
 Faculty of computing
 Chair of computer science
 Chair of programming
 Chair of mathematical foundations of computer science
 Chair of informatics lifelong learning
 Methodological laboratory of computer science studies
 Methodological laboratory of computing studies – the Linux centre
In addition to the university's various faculties and its medical wing, the Riga Medical College (Rīgas Medicīnas koledža), the University of Latvia offers most of the resources traditionally associated with accredited universities, including several libraries, research facilities, study centres, a language school, and a career centre.

Institute of Mathematics and Computer Science
The Institute of Mathematics and Computer Science of the University of Latvia (IMCS) was founded in 1959 as a computer research centre, now consisting of about 200 researchers, assistants, engineers, and software developers.

Institute of Geodesy and Geoinformatics

The Institute of Geodesy and Geoinformatics (GGI) of the University of Latvia is the reestablishment of the Institute of Geodesy since 1994. The researchers of the Institute of Geodesy (1924-1944) worked successfully on the research and education in many advanced topics of that time – development and adjustment of National geodetic networks, photogrammetry, studies of vertical Earth movement and research in gravimetric and magnetic measurements. Currently, the research areas are developed in satellite geodesy and geoinformatics. The main topic is the development of satellite laser ranging systems (SLR), both the hardware and control software.  Two SLR prototypes were developed until 2010 by spending low expenditures. The third most improved model is under development now. All the knowledge and experience of the staff gained since 1975 is applied. Younger colleagues are involved in the development process.

The prototype digital zenith camera for studies of vertical deflection has been developed recently. The test results reach a precision of 0.1 arc second which is very promising for the improvement of the quality of the National model of Latvia gravity field modelling. The recent version of the National gravity field developed at the Institute of Geodesy and Geoinformatics has achieved a precision of about 2 cm which is much higher than the previous model (7–8 cm) used in Latvia. The high precision gravity field model is very important for practice. It gives the possibility to achieve correspondingly high precision of normal height determination using Global Navigation Satellite Systems (GNSS) in geodetic measurements.

There has been achieved at the Institute of Geodesy and Geoinformatics the high precision results in studies of vertical and horizontal motion of the Earth in Latvia by carrying out the analysis of the 7 year GNSS observations at the LatPos and EUPOS-RIGA permanent station networks.

There are developed the GIS database for Latvia and cities of Latvia, developed digital terrain models.

Amateur Art Activities

The university has a number of amateur choirs, orchestras and dance groups, as well as a student theatre. Minjona is a women's choir based at the University of Latvia.

People

Notable professors and lecturers
 Indriķis Muižnieks, biologist
 Andris Ambainis, computer scientist
 Mārcis Auziņš, physicist
 Kārlis Balodis, economist
 Konstantīns Čakste, legal theorist and LCP Chairman, son of Latvian President Jānis Čakste
 Jānis Endzelīns, linguist
 Karlis Kaufmanis, astronomer
 Augusts Kirhenšteins, microbiologist
 Eižens Laube, architect
 Jānis Maizītis, lawyer and second Prosecutor General of Latvia
 Valdis Muktupāvels, ethnomusicologist and doctor of art criticism
 Velta Ruke-Dravina linguist, folklorist
 Andrejs Veisbergs, linguist

Notable alumni
 Māris Čaklais, Latvian poet
 Valdis Dombrovskis, Latvian politician, European Commissioner for Economic and Monetary Affairs and the Euro, former Prime Minister of Latvia
 Klāvs Elsbergs, Latvian poet
 Ivars Godmanis, Latvian politician, former Prime Minister of Latvia, MeP
 Uldis Ģērmanis, Latvian historian and writer
 Ivars Kalviņš, Latvian chemist, has worked on the foundation of mildronate
 Valdemārs Klētnieks, Latvian writer and national Scout Commissioner
 Guntars Krasts, Latvian politician, former Prime Minister of Latvia, MeP
 Hugo Teodors Krūmiņš, Latvian playwright and poet
 Kirovs Lipmans – Latvian business person and ice hockey executive
 Zenta Mauriņa, Latvian writer
 Artis Pabriks, Latvian politician, former Latvian Minister of Foreign Affairs
 Andris Piebalgs, Latvian politician and diplomat, former European Commissioner for Energy
 Ilmārs Poikāns, Latvian AI researcher, hacker
 Einars Repše, Latvian politician, former Prime Minister of Latvia
 Eliyahu Rips, Israeli mathematician
 Alfred Rosenberg, race theorist and an influential ideologue of the Nazi Party.
 Aminata Savadogo, Latvian singer, songwriter, finalist in Eurovision Song Contest 2015
 Knuts Skujenieks, Latvian poet, journalist
 Mikhail Tal, Soviet-Latvian chess grandmaster and eighth World Chess Champion, nicknamed "The Magician from Riga"
 Daina Taimiņa, Latvian mathematician
 Kristīne Ulberga, novelist, winner of the Raimonds Gerkens Prize.
 Guntis Ulmanis, Latvian politician, former President of Latvia
 Jānis Vanags, archbishop of the Evangelical Lutheran Church of Latvia
 Raimonds Vējonis, the 9th President of Latvia
 Antonija Vilcāne, Latvian medieval archaeologist

See also
 Libraries of the University of Latvia
 List of universities in Latvia
 Utrecht Network
 List of modern universities in Europe (1801–1945)
 Kalpaka Boulevard Library

References

External links

 
 University of Latvia Riga Medical College
 University of Latvia Institute of Mathematics and Computer Science

 
Law schools in Latvia
Educational institutions established in 1919
Public universities
Universities and colleges formed by merger in Latvia
1919 establishments in Latvia